Richardson's Theatre or Richardson's Show was a travelling fairground theatre founded in 1798 by John Richardson (1766–1836), which performed in London and the surrounding area in the early nineteenth century.

History

Richardson began his career as an actor.  He joined Mrs. Penley's travelling theatre company in 1782, but on seeing the small profits to be made with her, he left acting and moved to London, becoming a broker.  He eventually saved enough money to open his own troupe.

Richardson first opened his theatrical production at Bartholomew Fair in 1798 using scenery from Drury Lane.  The performances took place in a narrow booth (100 feet by 30 feet), colourful and brightly lit. The show toured, in the London area, to such fairs as Southwark, Brook Green and Greenwich.  Over time, Richardson's booth expanded, and he ran several performances simultaneously, and he could stage over a dozen burlesques and melodramas each day.  By 1828, the price of admission was sixpence, and refreshments were another profit source for the troupe.  The young Edmund Kean learned his craft here, before moving on to a more respectable theatrical environment. After Richardson's death, the show was continued until 1853 by Nelson Lee.

Contemporary account by Dickens
The show, as it existed at its grandest, near the end of Richardson's life, is described by Charles Dickens in Sketches by Boz:

Contemporary depictions
The booth appears on a brightly coloured sketch by Thomas Rowlandson.  Another view shows the crowd outside Richardson's booth.  This 1805 view shows Richardson's Theatre in the earlier days.

Notes

External links
The Fortunes of a Penny Showman: the Career of John Richardson, by Martha R. Mahard
Theatre Notebook

Theatre in England